The Chhattisgarh Legislative Assembly election, 2008 was held on 14 and 20 November 2008, to select the 90 members of the Chhattisgarh Legislative Assembly. The results of the election were announced on 8 December. The Bharatiya Janata Party won the popular vote and a majority of seats and the incumbent Chief Minister Raman Singh was sworn in as Chief minister for his second term.

Results

Party-wise Results

Elected members

Cabinet of Ministers
Source:
Raman Singh: Chief Minister
Ajay Chandrakar: Panchayat and Rural Development, Culture, Tourism, and Parliamentary Affairs
Amar Agrawal:  Public Health and Family Welfare, Medical Education, commercial tax and labor
Brijmohan Agrawal:  Agriculture, Animal Husbandry, Fisheries and Water Resources, Ayacut, religious trusts and charitable
Kedarnath Kashyap:  Tribal and Scheduled Caste Development, Backward Classes and Minorities Development, School of Education
Prem Prakash Pandey:  Revenue and Disaster Management, Rehabilitation, Higher Education, Technical Education, and Manpower Planning, Science & Technology

References

State Assembly elections in Chhattisgarh
2000s in Chhattisgarh
Chhattisgarh